The Wall of Sound is the second studio album by Israeli alternative folk artist Geva Alon, released on 13 July 2007.

One single was released from the album, a cover to David Bowie's classic hit single "Modern Love".

Track listing

Personnel
Geva Alon - lead vocals, guitar
Elran Dekel - bass, backing vocals
Nadav Hoshea - keyboards
Or Zubalski - drums, percussion
Mika Sade - backing vocals

2007 albums
Geva Alon albums